Elections to Dundee City Council were held on 3 May 2012 on the same day as the other Scottish local government elections. The election used the eight wards created as a result of the Local Governance (Scotland) Act 2004, with each ward electing three or four Councillors using the single transferable vote system form of proportional representation, with 29 Councillors elected.

After the 2007 Election a Labour-Lib Dem Coalition was formed. This administration subsequently collapsed in 2009 as a result of a by-election loss, and an SNP minority administration was formed.

The 2012 election saw the Scottish National Party gain 3 seats and secure an overall majority on the Council. The Scottish Labour Party retained their 10 seats on the Council while both the Scottish Conservative and Unionist Party and the Scottish Liberal Democrats were reduced to a single Councillor. There also remains a single Independent.

Election results

Note: "Votes" are the first preference votes. The net gain/loss and percentage changes relate to the result of the previous Scottish local elections on 3 May 2007. This may differ from other published sources showing gain/loss relative to seats held at dissolution of Scotland's councils.

Ward results

Strathmartine
2007: 1xSNP; 1xIndependent; 1xLab; 1xLib Dem
2012: 2xSNP; 1xLab; 1xIndependent
2007-2012 Change: SNP gain one seat from Lib Dem

Lochee
2007: 2xSNP; 2xLab
2012: 2xSNP; 2xLab
2007-2012 Change: No change

West End
2007: 1xLib Dem; 1xLab; 1xSNP; 1xCon
2012: 2xSNP; 1xLib Dem; 1xLab
2007-2012 Change: SNP gain one seat from Con

Coldside
2007: 2xSNP; 2xLab
2012: 2xSNP; 2xLab
2007-2012 Change: No change

Maryfield
2007: 2xSNP; 1xLab
2012: 2xSNP; 1xLab
2007-2012 Change: No change

North East
2007: 2xSNP; 1xLab
2012: 2xSNP; 1xLab
2007-2012 Change: No change

East End
2007: 2xSNP; 1xLab
2012: 2xSNP; 1xLab
2007-2012: No change

The Ferry
2007: 2xCon; 1xSNP; 1xLab
2012: 2xSNP; 1xCon; 1xLab
2007-2012 Change: SNP gain one seat from Con

Post-Election Changes
† On 16 January 2016 Maryfield SNP Cllr Craig Melville was suspended from the party and became an Independent. He resigned his Council seat on 5 February 2016 and a by-election was held on 31 March 2016 which was held by the SNP's Lynne Short.

By-election since 2012

References

External links
Dundee City Council website

2012
2012 Scottish local elections
21st century in Dundee